Edward Hudspith Elliott (19 April 1851, Sunderland, Tyne and Wear – 19 March 1885 at Carlton North, Victoria) was a Victorian first-class cricketer and Test match umpire.

Having arrived in Victoria at the age of one, he played eight matches for Victoria as a right-hand batsman, scoring 117 runs at an average of 8.35 with a highest score of 20 not out.  He also kept wickets, taking 13 catches and 8 stumpings.

Elliott umpired seven Test matches, and was the first Australian to regularly officiate. He made his debut in the match between Australia and England in Melbourne on 30 December 1882 to 2 January 1883.  In this series he and John Swift stood in all four Test matches, the first time two umpires had officiated throughout an entire series.  Moyes commented that "apparently we had reached the time when some kind of qualification was required and some consistency in appointment was observed." Elliott also umpired in three matches in the 1884–85 series, and died two days after his last appearance of a cerebral embolism (stroke).

Off the field, Elliott was a carpenter. He was married and left four children.

References
 Pollard, Jack, Australian Cricket: 1803–1893, The Formative Years. Sydney, The Book Company, 1995.
 Moyes, A. G., Australian Cricket: A History, Sydney, Angus & Robertson, 1959.

External links
 

1851 births
1885 deaths
Australian cricketers
Victoria cricketers
Australian Test cricket umpires
Sportspeople from Sunderland
English emigrants to Australia
Wicket-keepers